East Woody Island (Yolŋu: Dhamitjinya), is an island in Australia. It is located in East Arnhem Land in the Northern Territory. The closest town is Nhulunbuy. A sand spit connects the island to the Australian mainland.

References 

Islands of the Northern Territory
Geography of Australia